Leptosteges nigricostella is a moth in the family Crambidae. It was described by George Hampson in 1895. It is found in Paraná, Brazil.

References

Moths described in 1895
Schoenobiinae